Events in the year 1961 in Japan.  It corresponds to Shōwa 36 (昭和36年) in the Japanese calendar.

Incumbents 
Emperor: Hirohito
Prime minister: Hayato Ikeda (Liberal Democratic)

Governors
Aichi Prefecture: Mikine Kuwahara 
Akita Prefecture: Yūjirō Obata 
Aomori Prefecture: Iwao Yamazaki 
Chiba Prefecture: Hitoshi Shibata 
Ehime Prefecture: Sadatake Hisamatsu 
Fukui Prefecture: Eizō Kita 
Fukuoka Prefecture: Taichi Uzaki
Fukushima Prefecture: Zenichiro Satō 
Gifu Prefecture: Yukiyasu Matsuno 
Gunma Prefecture: Konroku Kanda 
Hiroshima Prefecture: Hiroo Ōhara 
Hokkaido: Kingo Machimura 
Hyogo Prefecture: Masaru Sakamoto 
Ibaraki Prefecture: Nirō Iwakami 
Ishikawa Prefecture: Jūjitsu Taya 
Iwate Prefecture: Senichi Abe 
Kagawa Prefecture: Masanori Kaneko 
Kagoshima Prefecture: Katsushi Terazono 
Kanagawa Prefecture: Iwataro Uchiyama 
Kochi Prefecture: Masumi Mizobuchi 
Kumamoto Prefecture: Kōsaku Teramoto 
Kyoto Prefecture: Torazō Ninagawa 
Mie Prefecture: Satoru Tanaka 
Miyagi Prefecture: Yoshio Miura 
Miyazaki Prefecture: Hiroshi Kuroki 
Nagano Prefecture: Gon'ichirō Nishizawa 
Nagasaki Prefecture: Katsuya Sato 
Nara Prefecture: Ryozo Okuda 
Niigata Prefecture: Kazuo Kitamura (until 30 November); Juichiro Tsukada (starting 10 December)
Oita Prefecture: Kaoru Kinoshita 
Okayama Prefecture: Yukiharu Miki 
Osaka Prefecture: Gisen Satō 
Saga Prefecture: Sunao Ikeda 
Saitama Prefecture: Hiroshi Kurihara 
Shiga Prefecture: Kyujiro Taniguchi 
Shiname Prefecture: Choemon Tanabe 
Shizuoka Prefecture: Toshio Saitō 
Tochigi Prefecture: Nobuo Yokokawa 
Tokushima Prefecture: Kikutaro Hara 
Tokyo: Ryōtarō Azuma 
Tottori Prefecture: Jirō Ishiba 
Toyama Prefecture: Minoru Yoshida 
Wakayama Prefecture: Shinji Ono 
Yamagata Prefecture: Tōkichi Abiko 
Yamaguchi Prefecture: Masayuki Hashimoto 
Yamanashi Prefecture: Hisashi Amano

Events
 January unknown date – Credit card brand JCB was founded.
 February 10 – Unicharm has founded.
 June to July – After a long period of torrential rain, cliff collapses and debris flows hit the Tenryū River area, Nagano Prefecture, according to Fire and Disaster Management Agency of Japan, official confirmed report, total 357 fatalities and 1,320 were injured nationwide. 
 August 19 – A magnitude 6.8 earthquake hit the border between Fukui, Ishikawa and Gifu Prefecture, according to Fire and Disaster Management Agency official confirmed report, 8 fatalities, 43 were wounded.
 September 17 – A superpower typhoon Nancy hit in western Japan, a storm surge occurred in Osaka Bay area, according to Fire and Disaster Management Agency of Japan, official confirmed report, 202 people lost their lives, 4,974 people were wounded nationwide. 
 October 26 – An accident occurred in which a suburban train was involved in a landslide caused by torrential rain and buried in Oita to Beppu line in Oita Prefecture, according to Fire and Disaster Management Agency of Japan, official confirmed report, 31 people lost their lives and 36 people were injured.

Births 
January 3 – Toshirō Yanagiba, actor
January 31 – Mako Ishino, singer and actress
February 6 – Yuko Kobayashi, voice actress
February 28 – Toshihiko Tahara, singer and actor
March 4 – Atsuko Asano, actress
March 7 – Sanae Takaichi, politician and cabinet minister
March 21 – Hiroshi Jofuku, football coach
April 26 – Hideki Kuriyama, professional baseball coach and former player
April 29 – Fumihiko Tachiki, voice actor
May 10 – Ayako Fuji, enka singer
June 7 – Kaoru Okazaki, former professional baseball player 
June 17 – Kōichi Yamadera, voice actor
July 5 – Eriko Kimura, Japanese director of audiography
July 8
 Kōki Mitani, screenwriter
 Nobue Matsubara, enka singer
July 14 – Keiko Saito, actress
August 16 – Urara Takano, voice actress
September 21 – Yumi Takada, voice actress
October 4 – Kazuki Takahashi, manga artist and game creator (d. 2022)
October 16 – Yahiro Kazama, former football coach and player
October 20 – Michie Tomizawa, voice actress and singer
November 21 – Maria Kawamura, voice actress
December 19 – Nobuyuki Kagawa, former professional baseball player (d. 2014)
December 24 - Eriko Kitagawa, screenwriter and director

Deaths 
January 16 – Roppa Furukawa, film actor (b. 1903)
July 23 – Shigeko Higashikuni, previously "Shigeko, Princess Teru", eldest child of Emperor Shōwa (b. 1925)
September 21 – Koji Uno, writer (b. 1891)
October 18 – Tsuru Aoki, actress (b. 1892)

See also
 List of Japanese films of 1961

References

 
Japan
Years of the 20th century in Japan